The Mediterranean Athletics Championships were an annual outdoor track and field competition between nations in the Mediterranean region that took place from 1947 to 1949. These events were a precursor to the Mediterranean Games, founded in 1951.

The Hellenic Amateur Athletic Association (SEGAS) sought to establish a regular athletics competition for the region, and scheduled the first event for 28–30 June 1935 at the Panathenaic Stadium in Athens. Seven countries were invited (Greece, France, Italy, Turkey, Yugoslavia, Egypt and Mandatory Palestine), but political and economic complications in the build up to World War II saw the cancellation of the event. When the war concluded, SEGAS looked to revive the idea, particularly given that the Balkan Athletics Championships was not taking place at this time.

The first event was organised as the Eastern Mediterranean Athletics Championships and held at the Panathenaic Stadium on 28 September, 4 and 5 October 1947 with the participation of three countries: Greece (40 athletes), Turkey (28) and Palestine (15). The 22 events were between men only and featured two athletes from each country, and one team each for the relay. The marathon race was held over the classic route, from Marathon, Greece to the Panathenaic Stadium. A total of 19 athletes participated in the marathon: 2 Turks, 2 Greeks and 15 other Greek runners not part of the team competition. Stylianos Kyriakides (2:56:15) was runner-up, with Turkey's Mustafa Kaplan in third with 3:04:20. Hammer throw was also held at the Panellinios G.S. stadium on 2 October. The Balkan relay event was over 1500 metres, with four legs divided into distances of 800 m, 400 m, 200 m, and 100 m. A team system allocated points based on finishing position, running from six points for first place to one point for sixth place. Turkey won the points competition, with Turkish athletes winning 14 events.

The event returned the following year, taking place at İnönü Stadium in Istanbul on 6, 12 and 13 June 1948, though there was reduced participation with only three countries: Greece, Turkey, Persia. Again 22 men's events were contested and Turkey topped the points table, though the marathon race was not included in the scoring. The marathon course had a difficult looped route, starting from İnönü Stadium, on to Tarabya, Büyükdere, Sarıyer and Beykoz Park, then back to İnönü Stadium. Five athletes finished the race. Hassan Yildirim finished in second with 3:08:46.0 and Christos Vartzakis was third in 3:13:24.2.

A third edition followed, but a diplomatic fall out between the Greek and Turkish national sports administrators, caused by events earlier that year at a Mediterranean Cup football match, meant only Turkey and five Italians athletes took part. The competition returned to Istanbul's İnönü Stadium from 9–11 September 1949. A reduced programme of 12 men's events took place, with Italy winning nine of them.

Editions

Participation

1947

Winners

Points table

1948

Winners

Points table

1949

Winners

Points table

References

Results
Αθλητική Ηχώ (Athletic Echo journal)  1947 to 1949.

International athletics competitions
Defunct athletics competitions
Recurring sporting events established in 1947
Recurring sporting events disestablished in 1949
Sport in the Mediterranean
Athletics competitions in Asia
Athletics competitions in Europe